Accrington Stanley Football Club is an English football club based in Accrington, Lancashire. The club participates in Football League One, the third tier of the English football league system.

History
The original town team, Accrington, were amongst the twelve founder members of the Football League in 1888, before resigning from the league after just five years. A team called Stanley Villa already existed at the time, named as such because they were based at the Stanley Arms on Stanley Street in Accrington. With the demise of Accrington, Stanley Villa took the town name to become Accrington Stanley. The club entered the Football League in 1921 with the formation of the old Third Division North, along with the other top northern non-League clubs. In 1960, amid persistent financial difficulties mainly relating to the speculative purchase of the new Burnley Road stand, Stanley were relegated to the recently formed Division Four. However, they only managed to complete one full season in this division as bankruptcy followed shortly afterwards. Stanley lost their last League match 4–0 away at Crewe on 2 March 1962. The club sent a letter of resignation to the Football League and the resignation was accepted by Alan Hardaker, the League Secretary on 11 March, mid-way through the 1961–62 season. Stanley were accepted into the Lancashire Combination Division Two for the next season. They performed respectably well in their first season in the Combination, and earned their first (and only) promotion the following year. Unfortunately this proved to be a false dawn, as Stanley were immediately relegated after finishing bottom of Division One. By this point the club's debts had become overwhelmingly large once again, and the start of 1966 saw the final end for the club, who resigned from the Lancashire Combination and disbanded.

At a meeting at Bold Street Working Men's Club in 1968 the revival was initiated, and in August 1970 the new club was accepted into the Lancashire Combination and played its first match at a new ground, the Crown Ground. Eric Whalley, a local businessman, took control of the club in 1995 and began the development of the club's ground. After the club was relegated in 1999, Whalley appointed John Coleman as manager. In 2005–06, Stanley won the Football Conference and were promoted to League Two, switching places with relegated Oxford United – in a reversal of fortune, the team that had been elected to replace the former Accrington Stanley as members of the Football League in 1962.

Key

Key to league record
 Level = Level of the league in the current league system
 Pld = Games played
 W = Games won
 D = Games drawn
 L = Games lost
 GF = Goals for
 GA = Goals against
 GD = Goals difference
 Pts = Points
 Position = Position in the final league table
 Top scorer and number of goals scored shown in bold when he was also top scorer for the division.

Key to cup records
 Res = Final reached round
 Rec = Final club record in the form of wins-draws-losses
 PR = Preliminary round
 QR1 (2, etc.) = Qualifying Cup rounds
 G = Group stage
 R1 (2, etc.) = Proper Cup rounds
 QF = Quarter-finalists
 SF = Semi-finalists
 F = Finalists
 A(QF,SF,F) = Area quarter-, semi-, finalists
 W = Winners

Seasons

External links
 (1891-66)
 (1968-current)

References

English football club seasons